Leon M. Goldstein (died January 8, 1999) was a college administrator, President of Kingsborough Community College, and acting Chancellor of the City University of New York. The Leon M. Goldstein High School for the Sciences and the Leon M. Goldstein Performing Arts Center are both named in his honor.

Early life and education
Goldstein was born in Borough Park, Brooklyn, to immigrants from Poland. He received his B.A. from City College of New York, and his M.A. from Brooklyn College.

Career

Goldstein taught and was ultimately a professor of history, dean of faculty, and Vice President at New York City Community College from 1960 to 1971.

Goldstein was President of Kingsborough Community College from 1971 to 1999. In 1981 he was also Deputy Chancellor of the City University of New York.

Goldstein was acting Chancellor of the City University of New York from July 1982 to September 1982, during which time he took a leave of absence from his position as President of Kingsborough Community College. He also served as CUNY's Dean for Community Colleges. He was Vice President of the Middle States Association of Colleges and Secondary Schools in 1994.

Goldstein died at his home in Manhattan on January 8, 1999, at 66 years of age.

The Leon M. Goldstein High School for the Sciences in Brooklyn, New York, was named in his honor. The 743-seat Leon M. Goldstein Performing Arts Center at Kingsborough was also named in his honor.

References

External links
"Tribute to Leon Goldstein on his 25th Anniversary", Hon. Charles E. Schumer, in the House of Representatives, May 29, 1996.

City College of New York alumni
City University of New York faculty
1999 deaths
Brooklyn College alumni
Chancellors of City University of New York
Educators from New York City
People from Borough Park, Brooklyn
American people of Polish descent
1930s births
20th-century American academics